Vera Julia Thulin (later Mirsky, 7 June 1893 – 9 April 1974) was a Swedish freestyle swimmer who competed in the 1912 Summer Olympics. She was eliminated in the first round of the 100 m event and finished fourth with the Swedish 4 × 100 m relay team. Her elder sister Willy competed in diving at the same Olympics.

References

1893 births
1974 deaths
Swedish female freestyle swimmers
Olympic swimmers of Sweden
Swimmers at the 1912 Summer Olympics
Sportspeople from Uppsala
Stockholms KK swimmers
20th-century Swedish women